Life Length is a Spanish life sciences and biotechnology company  founded in 2010. Located in Madrid, it provides telomere diagnostics, based on a technology, known as TAT (Telomere Analysis Technology) as well as related essays including Q-TRAP for telomerase measurement among others.

Founded by the American-born entrepreneur Stephen J. Matlin, together with the Botín Foundation, Spain’s largest private foundation, and Dr. María Blasco Marhuenda, the current Director of the National Center for Oncology Research in Spain (CNIO)  in 2010, with the objective to commercialize the conceptual work started by Dr. Blasco in her lab using HT Q-FISH  or High Throughput Quantitative Fluorescence in situ Hybridization.

Life Length is Spain’s most accredited laboratory as it holds the relevant Spanish licenses but is also Spain’s only U.S. Federally-accredited laboratory under CLIA as well as ISO 15189 certified. Life Length offers its services in three primary fields: for B2B clients in the pharmaceutical, biotech, nutraceutical and related industries providing its assays for drug development and validation including in stem cells therapies and CAR-T applications; for physicians and medical professionals working in concierge, age management, and personalized and preventive medicine worldwide and most recently in oncology, following the approval by the Agencia Española de Medicamentos y Productos Sanitarios (AEMPS)  for its prostate cancer diagnostic test.  Life Length has three main facilities: its clinic and corporate offices in Madrid and its laboratories located in Tres Cantos, just outside of Madrid.

History 
The company has greatly increased its research and development throughout the years and continues today to investigate and take part in many other projects:

	2010. Life Length was founded on September 28 as a spin-off of the Spanish National Cancer Research Center.  
	2016. CLIA certification is obtained, the highest U.S. government certification, and becomes the only federal laboratory in Spain. 
   2017. ONCOCHECK, a project made up of a series of clinical studies, received a funding of €3.1 million from the European Union's Horizon 2020 research and innovation program.
	2021. The clinic in Paseo del General Martinez Campos, 46 made its opening and quickly became the most highly rated clinic in Europe (per Google Reviews). 
	2022. The prostate cancer diagnosis product obtained the operating license from the AEMPS (Agency), and HEALTHTAV is launched.

Telomeres and their importance to the company 

Telomeres are part of our DNA and are found at the ends of chromosomes. Their function is to protect our DNA during each cell division by preventing chromosomes from adhering to each other or from losing important information. They represent the most precise biomarker to measure aging. Telomere deterioration has been associated with the ageing process and many other diseases.
Over the years, every time a cell divides, our telomeres successively shorten up to a point where the cells cannot divide any more. Subsequently, they either undergo a process called apoptosis (cells progressively die) or go into senescence (they lose their function). 
Many studies link long telomeres and a slower rate of telomere shortening with greater longevity. For example, research done on mice showed that individuals with hyper-long telomeres lived 13% longer than those with normal telomeres. However, they also store less fat, which also contributes to greater longevity. 
Due to the impact, they have at the cellular level, the length of telomeres and their rate of shortening is considered a relevant biomarker for assessing the state of aging of the entire organism.

Projects 
Oncocheck 

ONCOCHECK is a set of clinical studies conducted by Life Length during 2017. The aim of the project was the clinical validation of telomere-associated variables (TAVs) as cancer biomarkers. It involved more than 1,200 adults and 300 children suffering from one of multiple existing types of cancer, including breast, prostate, lung and leukemia cancers, among others. ONCOCHECK received funding from the European Union's Horizon 2020  research and innovation program. With more than 7,000 peer-reviewed scientific and clinical publications. Telomere length measurement has established itself as a biomarker in cancer diagnosis and prognosis. This project has the invaluable support of some of the most important hospitals in Spain such as “University Hospital 12 de octubre”, “University Hospital Puerta de Hierro”, “University Hospital Niño Jesús”, “Vall d'Hebron Hospital” and “Centro Integral Oncológico Clara Campal (CIOCC)”. Within the ONCOCHECK project, Life Length is also conducting studies in advanced solid tumors and chronic lymphocytic leukemia (CLL).
The results of the ONCOCHECK project have enabled Life Length to develop new applications in oncology . 

Prostate cancer diagnosis product 

Telomeres as cancer biomarkers:
Tumor cells work differently from normal cells. As a cell becomes cancerous, it divides more frequently, and its telomeres shorten faster.
Cancer cells avoid senescence/death and instead become immortal with the ability to replicate indefinitely, even when telomeres are short. Therefore, alterations in telomere length have great potential as a biomarker in cancer.

Prostate cancer is the second most occurring cancer for men around the world today. 1 out of 8 men suffer from it every year. This diagnosis is an in vitro diagnostic test (IVD) that makes it possible to identify patients with a higher risk of suffering from aggressive prostate cancer. Our prostate cancer diagnosis product, combined with the current screening method, can potentially prevent hundreds of prostate biopsies annually. Life Length has launched it on the market in 2022. It is a test that provides doctors with a useful and rapid tool for clinical decision-making.  
This test is a minimally invasive procedure that only requires a blood sample from the patient.

Other studies 
Lung cancer - 
Life Length is working on developing an algorithm to detect patients at risk for lung cancer. With its telomere measurement platform, the test could potentially fill the gap in lung cancer screening techniques in a routine, minimally invasive and low-cost way. Life Length was the European Seal of Excellence  by the European Commission  for its project proposal in lung cancer research. 

Childhood cancer -
Life Length has conducted the largest childhood cancer research project to date, obtaining samples from about 100 children with cancer and healthy children. The aim of the study was to help oncology and hematology specialists make better decisions and increase the chances of these children beating cancer. Life Length has carried out these studies with the support of one of the most important children's hospitals in Spain, the Hospital Infantil Universitario Niño Jesús.

More studies and projects 
Brain Age: Environmental influences in prenatal life have a major impact on brain aging and age-associated brain disorders. Aging is considered as a major risk factor of most neurogenerative diseases such as Alzheimer’s or Parkinson’s disease for example.
EuroBATS: Studies that uses both genetic and biological approaches. Study of 8,000 identical twins to identify markers of aging. The use of improving the length of the telomeres will be used in this process.
Frailomic: Utility of biomarkers to characterize elderly individuals at risk for frailty, its progression to disability outcomes, and overall health and well-being consequences. The main objective is to prevent and detect frailty before suffering from it.

Accreditations 
Life Length is considered the most accredited clinical laboratory in Spain.
	ISO 15189  – Granted by the International Organization for Standardization develop and publish International Standards. 
	Rhode Island Department of Health  – A state government agency helping to prevent diseases by protecting and promoting health and safety.  
License: The center of Health Facilities and Regulation authorized Life Length to conduct and maintain an Out of State Clinical Laboratory in conformity with RIGL C23-16.2. 
	CMS  – Centers for Medicare & Medicaid Services. Their objective would be to strengthen health equity, expand coverage, and improve health outcomes.  
License: Pursuant to Section 353 of the Public Health Services Act (42 U.S.C. 263a) as revised by the Clinical Laboratory Improvement Amendments (CLIA). 
	A2LA  – The American Association for Laboratory Accreditation provides comprehensive services in laboratory accreditation and laboratory-related training.  
	CDPH  – The California Department of Public Health is responsible for the public health of California. 
	Maryland Department of Health – The department supports and improves the health and safety through disease prevention, access to care, quality management, and community engagement. 
License: Pursuant to the provisions of TITLE 17, subtitle 2, Health-General Article 17-201 et seq., Annotated Code of Maryland 
	Pennsylvania Department of Health – The company´s objective is to promote healthy behaviors, prevent injury and disease, and assure the safe delivery of quality health care.  
License: Pursuant of the act of September 26, 1951, P.L., 1539 as amended, a Permit to operate a Clinical Laboratory. 
	Salud Madrid– The Servicio Madrileño de Salud is responsible for the system of public health services in the Community of Madrid. This public provider accredits the extraction of samples in non-health organizations. 
License: C.2.5.6 Centro de diagnóstico con unidades de U.72 Obtención de muestras, U.73 Análisis clínicos y U.74 Bioquímica clínica

Scientific publications 
Life Length has published to date the following articles:

In addition, numerous clients of Life Length have published articles based on the results for work performed by the company demonstrating the uniqueness of the TAT® and related technologies:

	Engineering osteoarthritic cartilage model through differentiating senescent human mesenchymal stem cells for testing disease-modifying drugs 
	Bovine Colostrum, Telomeres and Skin aging 
	Long-term Stability and Differentiation Potential of Cryopreserved CGMP-compliant Human Induced Pluripotent Stem Cells 
	Ergothioneine Mitigates Telomere Shortening under Oxidative Stress Conditions 
	Effect of Lutein (Lute-gen®) on Proliferation Rate and Telomere Length In Vitro and Possible Mechanism of Action 
	The Telomere Gestational Clock: Increasing Short Telomeres at Term in the Mouse 
	A Stably Self-Renewing Adult Blood-derived Induced Neural Stem Cell Exhibiting Pattern Ability and Epigenetic Rejuvenation 
	Study of Telomere Length in Preimplanted Cultured Chondrocytes 
	A Natural Product Telomerase Activator Lengthens Telomeres in Humans: A Randomized, Double Blind, and Placebo Controlled Study 
	Zen meditation, Length of Telomeres, and the Role of Experiential Avoidance and Compassion 
	Prenatal Undernutrition and Leukocyte Telomere Length in Late Adulthood: The Dutch famine birth cohort study 
	Personal Omics Profiling Reveals Dynamic Molecular and Medical Phenotypes 
	The Telomerase Activator TA-65 Elongates Short Telomeres and Increases Health Span of Adult/Old Mice Without Increasing Cancer Incidence

References 

Biotechnology companies
Companies based in Madrid
Spanish companies established in 2010